Tony May (born 7 March 1954) is a former Australian rules footballer who played with North Melbourne and Melbourne in the Victorian Football League (VFL).

Notes

External links 		
		
		
		
		
		
		
1954 births
Living people
Australian rules footballers from Victoria (Australia)		
North Melbourne Football Club players		
Melbourne Football Club players